Richard John Redmond (born August 14, 1949) is a Canadian former professional National Hockey League (NHL) defenceman. He featured in the 1973 Stanley Cup Finals with the Chicago Blackhawks.

He is the son of former Allan Cup winner Eddie Redmond and the brother of former NHL player and Red Wings broadcaster Mickey Redmond. He was born in Kirkland Lake, Ontario, but grew up in Peterborough, Ontario

Redmond played minor ice hockey in Peterborough, and went to the 1962 Quebec International Pee-Wee Hockey Tournament with his youth team. He played 13 seasons in the NHL, beginning as a first-round draft pick with the Minnesota North Stars in 1969. He was traded in 1970 to the California Golden Seals, and from there he was traded to the Chicago Black Hawks in 1972. In five seasons with the Black Hawks, Redmond played in 341 games and accumulated 227 points with 218 PIM. He was traded along with Bob MacMillan, Yves Bélanger and a second‐round selection in the 1979 NHL Entry Draft (23rd overall–Mike Perovich) from the St. Louis Blues to the Atlanta Flames for Phil Myre, Curt Bennett and Barry Gibbs on December 12, 1977. He finished his career with the Boston Bruins.

Career statistics

References

External links
 

1949 births
Living people
Atlanta Flames players
Boston Bruins players
California Golden Seals players
Canadian ice hockey defencemen
Chicago Blackhawks players
Ice hockey people from Ontario
Minnesota North Stars draft picks
Minnesota North Stars players
National Hockey League first-round draft picks
Peterborough Petes (ice hockey) players
St. Catharines Black Hawks players
St. Louis Blues players
Sportspeople from Kirkland Lake